The Cerebral Palsy International Sports and Recreation Association (CPISRA) is an international sports and recreation association for cerebral palsy and related neurological conditions. CPISRA organise recreational opportunities, develop adaptive sports and organise sport events for people with Cerebral Palsy and related neurological conditions. CPISRA was formed in 1969. It is made up of worldwide members and a community of volunteers including an advisory board, specialist committees and networks.

Sports
 Athletics
 Boccia
 CP football
 Swimming
 Wheelchair Slalom
 Racerunning

Members
48 Countries in 2022:

Regions
Asia: 13
Pacific: 1
Africa: 4
Americas: 6
Europe: 24

Countries

 
 
 
 
 
 
 Catalonia

Sport Events
The first CP World Games were held by the International CP Society (ICPS) in 1972. CPISRA became independent from the ICPS in 1978 and since then has held regular regional and world championships. In 2018, Sant Cugat in Spain hosted the CPISRA World Games and welcomed 600 participants from 30 countries for the broadest schedule to date, showcasing World Class competition in elite para-sport, as well as development sport camps and competitions.
CPISRA aim to hold regular regional games in Europe, the Americas, Australasia, Africa and India every four years; 2020, 2024, etc., with World Games every alternate 4 years; 2018, 2022, etc. In between these regional events run the CPISRA Development Games, including CPISRA endorsed and supported events to allow experience and participation in competitive sport and space for multi-sport development camps.
CPISRA also invests in developing people. CPISRA aims to extend the number of qualified classifiers, coaches and trainers at national, regional and international levels and recognise the diversity of cultures, and ensure improved communication and information.

Events
 Main Article : Cerebral Palsy Games (CPISRA World Games / CP Games)

See also 
 International Federation of Cerebral Palsy Football
 International Wheelchair and Amputee Sports Federation

References

External links
 The official website of this organisation
 Hong Kong Paralympic Committee & Sports Association for the Physically Disabled (A member agency of Sports Federation and Olympic Committee of Hong Kong, China)

Paralympic Games
Parasports organizations
Cerebral palsy organizations
International organisations based in Germany